František Bílek (6 November 1872, Chýnov – 13 October 1941, Chýnov) was a Czech sculptor and architect, in the Art Nouveau and Symbolist styles.

Biography
His father was a wheelwright. He graduated from primary school in Tábor, then went to study painting with Professor Maxmilián Pirner at the Academy of Fine Arts Prague. As it turned out, he was color blind so, on the advice of his teachers, he transferred to the State Industrial School, where he studied sculpture with Josef Mauder. His younger brother, would also become a sculptor.

In 1891, he received a scholarship from a patron, the businessman , which enabled him to study in Paris at the Académie Colarossi, with Jean Antoine Injalbert. He soon became part of a group of Czech artists living there, including Alfons Mucha. His initial works were inspired by his religious feelings. They included a "Golgotha, Mountain of Skulls", and one titled "Plowing is Our Penalty for Guilt". These were not well received by the scholarship commission in Prague, headed by Josef Václav Myslbek, who said the scholarship had been wasted. His patron, Lanna, was also displeased and withdrew his funding.

After completing a year of military service, he returned to Chýnov in 1893 and set up his own workshop. In 1898, he built a home, of his own design, which included a larger studio. He worked alone, belonging to no associations or commissions. In 1902 he married Berta Nečasová and, shortly after, moved to Prague. There, he became a member of the Mánes Union of Fine Arts. When the old city walls were demolished, he bought some land in the Hradčany district where, in 1911, he designed and built the Villa Bílek; set freely in a natural environment.

His relationship to Catholicism, though deep, had always been fraught with disagreements. In 1921, he and his family converted to the Czechoslovak Hussite Church. Over the following years, he designed numerous ceremonial objects and small sculptures for various congregations. In 1928, he created a monument to Jan Hus in Tábor.

In the early 1930s, his health went into a serious decline. Following the German occupation of Prague, he and his family returned to Chýnov. He is buried in the local cemetery, with one of his own statues ("Prayer Over the Graves", 1905) serving as a monument.

In his will, he expressed the wish that his villa be used for a museum. In 1963, his widow Berta made a formal donation of the property. The family home in Chýnov was donated by his granddaughter, Alena, and has also been devoted to his works. The façade is decorated with his reliefs, accompanied by mystical texts.

References

Further reading
 Vilém Nečas, Bílek: The Testimony of Brother František, Malvern, 2015 
 Martin Jindra: "František Bílek a jeho rodina v Církvi československé". In: Víra a umění Františka Bílka, CČSH ve spolupráci s Kulturní radou a LHODR, 2012, pp. 35–76 
 Martin Jindra, "Macešský život hostií podle návrhu Františka Bílka v Církvi československé husitské", In: Theologická revue, 2020, Vol.91, #1, pp. 70–79.
 Milena Mikulecká (Ed.): František Bílek v Církvi československé husitské, ÚR CČSH, 2000

External links

Radio Prague, "Frantisek Bilek - visionary sculptor, mystic, architect" by Jan Velinger
 Works by and about Bílek @ the National Library of the Czech Republic
 Biographical notes and works @ AbART
 Inventory of works @ the National Gallery
Historical photographs in the Šechtl & Voseček family archives

1872 births
1941 deaths
People from Chýnov
People from the Kingdom of Bohemia
Czech male sculptors
Czech architects
Art Nouveau architects
Art Nouveau sculptors
Symbolist sculptors
20th-century Czech sculptors
20th-century Czech male artists
Académie Colarossi alumni